Jabar Shumate (born January 26, 1976) was a Democratic Party politician in the U.S. state of Oklahoma. He is former member of both the Oklahoma Senate and the Oklahoma House of Representatives.

Early life and career
Shumate was born January 26, 1976, in Tulsa, Oklahoma. He graduated from the University of Oklahoma with a bachelor's degree in public affairs and administration. During his time at the university, he served as student body president.

Political career
Since his election, Shumate has worked on education reform and health issues. He co-authored a study to look at ways to incentivize healthier foods in urban Tulsa neighborhoods. He has also held leadership positions in the Oklahoma legislative black caucus.

Shumate had a tough 2010 primary, edging out a primary opponent after education unions threw their support behind his opponent.

Shumate left the Oklahoma House of Representatives to run for a state Senate seat. He faced a member of the Tulsa City council in a 2012 primary for the state Senate seat vacated by Judy Eason McIntyre.

University of Oklahoma Resignation

Shumate would be appointed to a newly created role as the Vice President of University Community in 2015.  After 3 years in his role, Shumate would resign after an internal audit produced evidence that he had misappropriated school property. OU General Counsel Anil Gollahalli noted that Shumate "should have been aware of the statute broken as it was part of an amended law passed during Shumate's time in the state legislature".

The audit of Shumate activities would ultimately cite approximately 124 times between July 1, 2017 thru March 29, 2018 in which he would misappropriate a car provided to him for work purposes as well as several instances of Unauthorized Use of Fleet Fuel Card and False Travel Claims.

Personal life
Shumate married Jillian Leggett on November 12, 2011, after proposing to her at his church on February 13, 2011.

References

External links
Jabar Shumate Biography, VoteSmart.org
Oklahoma House of Representatives
Follow the Money - Jabar Shumate
2008 2006 2004 campaign contributions

Democratic Party members of the Oklahoma House of Representatives
1976 births
Living people
Politicians from Tulsa, Oklahoma
University of Oklahoma alumni
Democratic Party Oklahoma state senators
21st-century American politicians
African-American state legislators in Oklahoma